Ana Zakhaidze (born 24 June 1995) is a Georgian football forward.

External links 
 

1995 births
Living people
Women's footballers from Georgia (country)
Georgia (country) women's international footballers
Women's association football forwards